Pruzhany District or Pruzhanski Rayon) is district (raion) of Brest Region, in Belarus. Its administrative center is Pruzhany.

Demographics
At the time of the Belarus Census (2009), Pruzhany Raion had a population of 52,511. Of these, 87.5% were of Belarusian, 6.4% Russian, 3.4% Ukrainian and 1.9% Polish ethnicity. 65.4% spoke Belarusian and 31.7% Russian as their native language.

Administrative Divisions 
The district is subdivided into 1 city and 12 rural councils administering a total of 245 settlements (2 urban and 243 rural).

References 

 
Districts of Brest Region